Alan Fowler (20 November 1911 – 10 July 1944) was an English professional footballer who played for Whitehall Printers, Brodsworth Main, Leeds United, Swindon Town, Queens Park Rangers and Watford, as a striker. He was killed in action during the Second World War.

Military career
Fowler enlisted in the Dorsetshire Regiment of the British Army in 1940, and rose to become a PT instructor with the rank of sergeant. In 1941, Fowler was commended for saving three men's lives in a grenade accident.

His battalion, the 4th Battalion of the Dorsetshire Regiment, part of the 43rd (Wessex) Infantry Division, arrived in France on 24 June and was involved in Operation Jupiter, the attack on the city of Caen. On 10 July 1944, Fowler's battalion was ordered to attack the villages of Eterville and Martot. During this operation, Fowler was killed by a friendly aerial bombardment coordinated by 4 Hawker Typhoons.

See also
List of footballers killed during World War II

References

1911 births
1944 deaths
British Army personnel killed in World War II
English footballers
Brodsworth Welfare A.F.C. players
Leeds United F.C. players
Swindon Town F.C. players
Swindon Town F.C. wartime guest players
Queens Park Rangers F.C. wartime guest players
Watford F.C. wartime guest players
English Football League players
Association football forwards
Dorset Regiment soldiers
Military personnel killed by friendly fire
Friendly fire incidents of World War II
Deaths by airstrike during World War II
Military personnel from Leeds